On August 4, 2009, at 9:25 am EDT a major thunderstorm producing large hail and winds in excess of  advanced at the leading edge of a cold front moving across the American Midwest, causing a flash flood that struck Louisville and portions of the surrounding Kentuckiana region. The flood was the third major disaster to strike the region in less than one year. (Winds from Hurricane Ike knocked out the electrical grid, an ice storm took out the electrical grid, then the flash flood.)

Early damage estimates were in the hundreds of millions of dollars. The University of Louisville and the Louisville Public Library's main branch each sustained millions of dollars in damage. On August 12, Governor of Kentucky Steve Beshear requested the federal government declare all of Jefferson County, Kentucky a major disaster area.

Storm

A slow moving cluster of thunderstorms descended from central Indiana into south-central Indiana and north-central Kentucky. As it entered the region at the head of a cold front, the storm strengthened significantly and began producing hail, strong winds, and heavy rain. As the storm moved into the Louisville Metropolitan Area, it continued to strengthen as a torrential downpour inundated the area. By the end of the day, more rain fell than is normal for the entire month of August. Downtown Louisville, New Albany, Jeffersonville, and Clarksville were particularly hard hit with water depth surpassing four feet in some areas, resulting in the first ever flash flood emergency being issued for those areas at 9:35 am EDT. Creeks and streams quickly flooded many neighborhoods, and flash floods rendered numerous streets and areas impassable. Severe lightning and wind that accompanied the storm led to more widespread damage.

Rain continued throughout the day, letting up at around 1 pm EDT. The ground had already been saturated from rains in the preceding days causing water levels to drop slower than normal. By 3 pm EDT a light rain resumed, but most of the flood waters had receded in the higher elevations of the city. Deep pools of standing water remained in isolated areas of the city until August 5.

Travel impact

The Louisville International Airport was closed and flights were diverted to Lexington, Kentucky until 1 pm EDT. Northbound Northwest Airlines flight 2287, traveling from Knoxville to Minneapolis, passed through the storm over Louisville and experienced severe turbulence, injuring two passengers and forcing the plane make an emergency landing at Lexington. The underground levels of all the city parking garages were completely underwater, destroying hundreds of automobiles. TARC, the city's public transportation system, was paralyzed with most buses abandoning their routes.

Partly due to debris washing onto the roadways, numerous automobile accidents, and people abandoning their vehicles because of rising waters, caused I-71, I-64, I-65, and part of the Watterson Expressway (I-264) and The Gene Snyder Freeway (I-265) were shut down. Surrounding cities of New Albany, Jeffersonville, and Clarksville, Indiana were also affected. In New Albany, several parked cars were washed into the Ohio River. Additionally, most city streets were rendered impassable and several other important roadways were closed for hours. Across both Indiana and Kentucky, the massive amount of water entering the cities' underground viaducts caused a pressure build-up, blowing off a number of man-hole covers, which created dangerous road hazards.

Emergency response

Police and city officials considered ordering an evacuation of the entire downtown area as the city declared a flood emergency, but ordered people to remain in their homes and the highest point possible. Police and emergency responders began rescuing people trapped in cars and homes. Reports were made of people and bodies in the floodwaters during the deluge, but no deaths or injuries were confirmed. Police and emergencies responders from around the region were called in to assist in the relief efforts.

Governor of Kentucky Steve Beshear dispatched two fast water boats to assist in water rescues. By 3 pm EDT, Governor of Indiana Mitch Daniels sent two companies of the Indiana National Guard to assist with cleanup among the communities on the Indiana side of the Ohio River. Over two hundred people were rescued from their cars during the course of the day, with about fifty people being rescued from their homes. Most people were able to escape rising waters to higher ground without emergency help. Assistance was also provided to the downtown area to help tens of thousands of people in leaving.

Damage

The National Weather Service in Louisville was struck by lightning at about 9:20 am EDT, halting all operations at the location. The local emergency broadcast tower was also hit, briefly stopping all emergency communication in the city. The WDRB television news studio had water rise into the building during its newscast, prompting a makeshift water barrier to be erected during the broadcast. At 9ː55 am EDT, a Severe Thunderstorm Watch was issued until 4 pm EDT and at about 10:40 am EDT, the National Weather Service extended the Flood Warning for the city until 1 pm EDT due to new and heavy bands of thunderstorms entering the area. Lightning struck an apartment complex in the Hurstborne neighborhood, starting a fire that consumed most of the sixteen unit building. A second apartment in the west-end of Louisville was struck by lightning and destroyed by the fire caused by the strike.

The University of Louisville, which was closed and evacuated at about 10:45 am EDT because of rising water on the campus, was among the worst hit. The university sustained over $15 million in damages with five campus buildings sustaining significant flood damage and at least four others sustaining minor damage.

The main branch of the Louisville Public Library was under three  of water destroying tens of thousands of books, including the newly purchased books and donations being sorted in the basement, and destroying dozens of computers; in total causing over $1 million in damage. Many people were stuck in buildings for hours because of high water in surrounding areas. The main branch sustained just over $5 million in damage and was closed for a month of repairs, outlying branches also sustained damage but to a lesser extent.

Numerous other buildings went underwater and had to be evacuated including the Cancer Society, Churchill Downs and the horse barns were under three feet of water at varying points. The trackside barns remained above the water level and 35 horses were moved there. Water rose so high on the south side of Louisville that most cars parked on the street were completely submerged.

At least 20,000 LG&E customers had power service disrupted in Kentucky. Most LG&E power terminals were underground and at least a dozen were flooded, including the terminal powering their headquarters. Four thousand Duke Energy customer lost power in southern Indiana. Norton Hospital was closed and patients evacuated to upper levels. Three local animal shelters were flooded killing at least nine animals.

Hundreds of homes received major water damage in both Indiana and Kentucky including the U.S. Census Bureau building. Most of downtown New Albany was under  of water. Thousands of cars were destroyed around the city, with early damage estimates in the hundreds of millions of dollars.

During the first half of August damages were still being calculated. To get assistance for damaged households, Governor Beshear requested Jefferson County be declared a major disaster area by the federal government on August 12.

News coverage

The storm and flood received uninterrupted local radio and television coverage beginning around 9:15 am and continued into the afternoon hours. About 1:15 pm EDT the flood began to be reported on the national news networks. First on CNN, and later on the evening newscasts of the major networks.

References

External links

August 2009 Flood Collection - A selection of 210 digital images and 3 digital videos of the August 4, 2009 flood, documented and donated by community members to the University of Louisville (Louisville, Ky.)

History of Louisville, Kentucky
Natural disasters in Kentucky
Natural disasters in Indiana
2009 floods in the United States
2009 in Indiana
2009 in Kentucky
Floods in the United States